is a Japanese term for a category of mascot characters; usually created to promote a place or region, event, organisation or business. They are characterized by their kawaii (cute) and unsophisticated designs, often incorporating motifs that represent local culture, history or produce. They may be created by local government or other organizations to stimulate tourism and economic development, or created by a company to build on their corporate identity. They may appear as costumed characters (or kigurumi) at promotional events and festivals. Yuru-chara has become a popular and lucrative business, with character-driven sales reaching nearly $16 billion in Japan in 2012.

Popular yuru-chara include Kumamon, Funassyi, and Chiitan, who have gained international recognition and have reached celebrity status in Japan.

Etymology 
The adjective  generally means "loose", but in this application it has a number of connotations including "gentle" or "weak", "laid-back", light-hearted or "unimportant".

The term  has also become popular in reference specifically to local mascots, which is the large majority of yuru-kyara.

Concept 
The term was coined by illustrator and cultural critic  in the early 2000s, and despite the negative connotations the title has been embraced by fans and promoters. Miura has stated that there are three main requirements that make a yuru-chara:

 It must convey a strong message of love for one's hometown or local region
 The character's movements or behaviour should be unique and unstable or awkward
 The character should be unsophisticated or laid-back (yurui) and lovable

Some of these imply that the mascot must exist in kigurumi form.

Yuru-chara are often designed by amateur artists, and many designs are seen as naive or poorly executed, or can appear to oversimplify what they represent. These characteristics generally add to their appeal, but occasionally can cause the opposite reaction: The unveiling of Sento-kun in 2008 created a lot of negative publicity, since he was regarded as "ugly" and even "blasphemous".

These "amateurish" or flawed aspects are what set yuru-chara apart from professionally created corporate mascots (e.g. Domo-kun), professional sports mascots (such as those of Nippon Professional Baseball teams), and commercially oriented characters such as Hello Kitty and Rilakkuma - all of which are also commonplace in Japan.

Popularity 
The popularity of mascots like yuru-chara in Japan has been linked to historical emotional bonds to non-human characters, such as in ancient polytheism. There are also many different yōkai in Japanese folklore, and certain types of yōkai such as kappa and tanuki have been the basis for several yuru-chara designs.

Although the concept had been around for some time, the start of the "yuru-chara boom" is accredited to Hikonyan, who was created in 2007 to mark the 400th anniversary of the founding of Hikone Castle and created a significant increase in tourism and merchandise sales for castle and the city.

Since then, the number of yuru-chara increased throughout the country. Festivals and other events dedicated to these mascots were created, such as the  held in various locations since 2008. Some mascots have also appeared in international conventions, such as Funassyi and Kumamon in the 2014 Japan Expo in Paris, France; and a small group in the 2014 Japan Matsuri in London.

 is an online database which collects information about gotōchi-chara, yuru-chara and local heroes from user submissions. In October 2014 it surpassed 3,000 character entries.

The proliferation of yuru-chara by has become problematic in some regions. In 2014, the Osaka government expressed concern that there were too many local mascots, and it was diluting brand identity.

Chiitan, an unofficial mascot for Susaki, Kōchi Prefecture, became popular due to its chaotic and often violent behavior, which generated significant controversy.

Yuru-chara Grand Prix
Previous winners include Hikonyan and Kumamon.

There were 1,727 entrants in the 2015 Grand Prix, over ten times the number in the first contest. 1092 entries consisted of gotōchi-chara (local characters), and 635 were corporate or other characters. Results were announced on 23 November with 50.57 million total internet votes (over twice the number of votes in 2014) and almost seven million votes going to the winning mascot, Shusse Daimyō Ieyasu-kun. Around 77,000 people attended the awards event in Hamamatsu.

Records 
Yuru-chara gatherings have been involved in creating two Guinness World Records:
 Largest mascot dance: 134 mascots danced together in Huis Ten Bosch theme park in 2013.
 Largest gathering of mascots: 376 mascots at the 4th annual Yuru-chara Summit in Hanyū, 2013.

Features 

Yuru-chara try to portray some aspect of the place they are representing, be it local produce, a historical figure or legend, local wildlife, architecture or geography. This is often incorporated into their physical appearance in an amusing or unusual way, e.g. Fukka-chan (ふっかちゃん), mascot of Fukaya has two green onions sprouting out of its head (green onions being a popular product of Fukaya). Their name may also be a play on words, such as with Kumamon.

In public appearances, most yuru-chara are silent, and usually act in a playful or childish manner. Some exceptions include Funassyi and  who do talk in character, but neither are officially affiliated with any local government.

Merchandise 
Many yuru-chara have various associated merchandise as an alternative source of income. These typically include stuffed toys, keychains, sticker sets for Line (a popular instant messaging system in Japan) and stationery. As an acknowledgement of the large adult fanbase of yuru-chara, there are also some more adult-oriented products such as sake and themed credit cards.

Music 
Yuru-chara often have a theme song with related dance routine, such as Kumamon's  which has seen over 2.6 million views on YouTube. Funassyi has also released two novelty singles in 2013 and 2014, and an album in 2014. A band also formed in 2013 called  - the name being a play on the group AKB48 and the number of prefectures in Japan - which consists of six yuru-chara who play instruments live in costume and singer/guitarist Yohsuke Ishida. They have also released a single, and often perform at yuru-chara events.

Video games 
In 2014, Bandai Namco Games released the video game  on Nintendo 3DS and Wii U. It is a sugoroku-style party game where players travel around Japan and encounter gotōchi-chara (120 are featured in the game) along with local products and specialities. The character  was created to promote the game, and was entered into the 2014 Yuru-chara Grand Prix.

Funassyi and Kumamon have made appearances in 2014 releases of the Taiko no Tatsujin video games. Kumamon also featured in the 2014 3DS game Yo-Kai Watch 2.

See also
Chibi (slang)
Choruru
Funassyi
Hikonyan
Kigurumi, costumed characters
Kumamon
Mayumaro
Shimanekko, the mascot character for Shimane Prefecture
Local hero (Japan)

References

Further reading

External links

Japan National Tourism Organization - Yuruchara
Yuru-chara Grand Prix official website (in Japanese)
Japan Local Character Association (in Japanese)
Gotōchi-chara Catalogue (ご当地キャラカタログ, in Japanese)

Japanese mascots
Advertising characters
Japanese popular culture